Jose Martinez (born ) is a Mexican volleyball player. He is part of Mexico men's national volleyball team, and represented Mexico at the Olympic Games 2016 Rio. 
At club level he currently plays for the WA Steel, who play in the Australian Volleyball League Previously, he played for Strasbourg Volley-Ball  in France.

Early life
Martínez was born in Tijuana, Baja California. He attended Mater Dei Catholic High School in Chula Vista, California, where he started playing volleyball and graduated in 2011. A four-year varsity starter, he was named  to the second All-Metro League team. He also lettered in water polo under coach Guy Souza.

Career
During the summer of 2016, Martínez along with Mexico men's national volleyball team, ended their 48-year absence in the Olympic Games, when they secured the final place at stake for the Rio 2016 Olympic Games through the World Olympic Qualification Tournament, which took place in their home turf in Mexico City.

References

External links
 profile at FIVB.org

1993 births
Living people
Mexican men's volleyball players
Place of birth missing (living people)
Sportspeople from Tijuana
Olympic volleyball players of Mexico
Volleyball players at the 2016 Summer Olympics
Central American and Caribbean Games bronze medalists for Mexico
Competitors at the 2018 Central American and Caribbean Games
Central American and Caribbean Games medalists in volleyball